Terre Town is an unincorporated community in northern Harrison Township, Vigo County, in the U.S. state of Indiana. Now within the borders of the city of Terre Haute, it is part of the Terre Haute metropolitan area.

The community is home to Terre Town Elementary School.

Geography

References

Unincorporated communities in Indiana
Unincorporated communities in Vigo County, Indiana
Terre Haute metropolitan area